Adrian Wilson (born 19 December 1969 in Cape Town, South Africa) is a South African model and actor.

Wilson Started out as a male model, signed to Beatrice Model agency in Milan, Italy, Boss Model Management in his hometown of Cape Town, South Africa, New York Model Management, and L.A. Models. Wilson studied marketing and advertising in his native Cape Town, South Africa, before coming to the United States.

He portrayed the role of Christopher Boothe on the daytime soap opera Passions from 18 August 2005 until spring 2007. Wilson also appeared in the Hallmark Channel's sci-fi movie, Supernova.

The 6'2" actor resides in Santa Monica, California, with his wife, Kai.

External links

 Adrian Wilson profile - SoapCentral.com
 

South African male soap opera actors
Male actors from Cape Town
1969 births
Living people